Thomas Hill (January 7, 1818 – November 21, 1891) was an American Unitarian clergyman, mathematician, scientist, philosopher, and educator.

Biography
Taught to read at an early age, Hill read voraciously and was well regarded for his capacious and accurate memory. His father taught him botany, and he took a delight in nature and devised scientific instruments, one that calculated eclipses and was subsequently awarded the Scott Medal by the Franklin Institute.

Though not formally educated in his youth, Hill briefly attended the Lower Dublin Academy in Holmesburg, Pennsylvania and the Leicester Academy in Massachusetts, now the Leicester campus of Becker College, leaving in 1837.

He earned his A.B. and D.Div. from Harvard University in 1843 and 1845 respectively. He was later made an honorary member of the Hasty Pudding. Hill was president of Antioch College from 1860 to 1862 until the Civil War forced the college to shut down; he then held the presidency of Harvard University from 1862 to 1868. Ill health caused his retirement from Harvard, and from 1873, he was head of the Unitarian parish in Portland, Maine.

In 1863, he was elected as a member of the American Philosophical Society. Hill claimed to have injured his testicle while gardening, an incident that made him wary of laboratory instruction at Harvard, warning students not to exert themselves too much in their studies.

Hill's home in Waltham, Massachusetts, where he began his career, is listed on the National Register of Historic Places.

References

External links
 Biography, part of a series of Harvard's Unitarian Presidents
 Book: The True Order of Studies
 John Scott Medal, Franklin Institute
 Mechanical Calculators of the 19th Century
 Hill Arithmometer
 U.S. Patent 18692 T. Hill Arithmometer

1818 births
1891 deaths
American Unitarians
Presidents of Harvard University
Presidents of Antioch College
Antioch College
Harvard Divinity School alumni
Leicester Academy alumni